Montigny-lès-Arsures (literally Montigny near Arsures) is a commune in the Jura department in Bourgogne-Franche-Comté in eastern France.

Geography 
Montigny is located in the heart of the Jura wine region, in the north-east of the Jura, on the Jura Wine Route and the Route Pasteur. The village also boasts the title of Capital of Trousseau, a local grape variety, since the village's limestone soils particularly suit these grapes' requirements. The Larine stream springs forth in the village which it then proceeds to cross.

Arbois is 3 km from Montigny, Besançon 45 km, Dijon 30 km and Lausanne 100 km.

See also 
 Communes of the Jura department
 Frederic Lornet
 French wine
 Jura wine

References

External links 

Communes of Jura (department)